Robert E. Craven, Sr. (born November 19, 1955) is an American politician and a Democrat in the Rhode Island House of Representatives representing District 32 since January 1, 2013. He serves as Chairman of the House Municipal Government Committee  and a member of the House Judiciary Committee. Craven also serves on the R.I. Governor's Justice Reinvestment Working Group.

Education
Chairman Craven graduated from La Salle Academy in Providence in 1974. He earned his BA from the University of Rhode Island and his JD from the New England School of Law.

Elections
2016 - On November 8, 2016, Rep. Bob Craven was re-elected as RI State Representative of District 32 (North Kingstown). Craven received 4327 (55.5%) votes while his opponent, Mark S. Zaccaria, received 3455 (44.3%) votes.
2014 - On November 4, 2014, Craven was re-elected as Rhode Island State Representative of District 32, representing North Kingstown. Rep. Craven received 3111 (51.9%) votes while his opponent, Sharon L. Gamba, received 2867 (47.8%) votes.
2012 - Craven was unopposed in the September 11, 2012 Democratic Primary, winning with 326 votes. On November 6, 2012 he won the General election with 4,067 votes (54%) against District 32 incumbent Republican Representative Laurence Ehrhardt's 3,440 (45.7%).

Legislation

Rep. Robert E. Craven, during his time in the Rhode Island House of Representatives, is responsible for legislation that:

Exempted social security income from taxation 
Improved Rhode Island's estate tax, resulting in reduced/lowered taxes 
Expanded legal protections for those who seek medical assistance for individuals experiencing a drug overdose (the "Good Samaritan" bill)  
Eliminated the "master lever" on election ballots 
Obtained $6 million in federal funds to repair storm-damaged piers at Quonset Business Park 
Increased criminal penalties for DUIs with children in car 
Prioritized restitution payments to crime victims 
Barred sales and ownership of guns with altered serial numbers 
Amended the State False Claim Act, allowing Rhode Island to continue receiving federal funding 
Permitted local law enforcement departments share in litter fines 
Required all children's jewelry to conform higher safety standards 
Reformed the RI campaign finance system, requiring politicians to keep campaign accounts separate from personal accounts 
Prohibited electronic tracking of automobiles 
Allowed police officers in a close pursuit to conduct a vehicle stop in a neighboring municipality 
Required sex traffickers to register as sex offenders 
Improved safety measures in "School Zones"

Professional

Robert E. Craven was admitted to the Rhode Island Bar in 1983. Since then, Attorney Craven has been the Town Solicitor in Foster, RI (1998-2004), is the current Town Solicitor in Charlestown, RI (2007–Present), and Assistant Solicitor for East Providence (2008–Present). Attorney Robert Craven is also the Probate Judge for the Town of Charlestown, RI. Attorney Craven served as Assistant Attorney General for the State of Rhode Island during 1983–1992 where he was the lead trial lawyer and served as the Chief of the Public Corruptions Unit during that time. During 1995–2001, Attorney Craven served as the Legal Counsel for the Rhode Island State Board of Elections.

From 1994-1996, Attorney Craven served on the Town Council of North Kingstown, RI where he led the fight to develop the Quonset Industrial Park by negotiating a payment in lieu of taxes with the State of Rhode Island to attract business development, jobs and tax revenue to the Town. He also served as President and sat on the Board of Directors from 1993-1996 at the Center for Non-Violence in Providence, Rhode Island.

Attorney Robert E. Craven has also served as an adjunct instructor for the Community College of Rhode Island where he taught courses in the business department and law department each semester from 1983-2002.

Presently, Attorney Craven is the sole proprietor of a private-practice law firm in North Kingstown, RI.

References

External links
Official page at the Rhode Island General Assembly
Campaign site
Robert Craven at Ballotpedia
Robert E. Craven, Sr. at OpenSecrets
Legal Office Website 

Place of birth missing (living people)
1955 births
Living people
Democratic Party members of the Rhode Island House of Representatives
New England Law Boston alumni
People from Washington County, Rhode Island
Rhode Island lawyers
University of Rhode Island alumni
21st-century American politicians